Arrow of Time / The Cycle of Time is the tenth album of composer Peter Michael Hamel, released in 1991 through Kuckuck Schallplatten.

Track listing

Personnel
Cappella Istropolitana – instruments
Hubert Geschwandtner – engineering
Peter Michael Hamel – composer
Benno Hess – illustration
Karol Kopernicky – production
Ulrich Kraus – mastering
Jaroslav Krček – conductor
Wolf Huber – photography
Fernando Lippa – illustration
Mario Markus – illustration
Eckart Rahn – production
Daniela Ruso – harpsichord

References

1991 albums
Kuckuck Schallplatten albums
Peter Michael Hamel albums